Quantitative methods provide the primary research methods for studying the distribution and causes of crime. Quantitative methods provide numerous ways to obtain data that are useful to many aspects of society. The use of quantitative methods such as survey research, field research, and evaluation research as well as others. The data can, and is often, used by criminologists and other social scientists in making causal statements about variables being researched.

History and development of quantitative research in criminology
A general definition for criminology is a scientific approach to the study of criminal behavior. By this definition, one of the first appearances of criminology was the work of Cesare Beccaria in 1764 related to torture and the death penalty. Beccaria's contribution to criminology was foundational, but purely philosophical. Quantitative methods in Criminology were developed later during the 19th century resurgence of positivism spearheaded by well-known sociologist Émile Durkheim, who is responsible for one of the first modern research projects titled Suicide. It was published in 1897 and was the first work of its kind to include quantitative data, mainly suicide rates across different populations. This study marks the first documented use of quantitative research methods in the field of criminology. The first case of this in the United States occurred at the University of Chicago, around 1915 where scientists were studying the massive immigration into the city. It provided an ideal setting for empirical studies, where the scientists were testing hypotheses related to the proneness to criminal behavior. To study this they looked at recorded convictions, environment and social experiences, from which they recorded data and statistics to formulate a conclusion for the study. American criminology was greatly influenced by British criminology due to the large number of social scientist that developed criminology theories. Some of these early criminologist theorists were Karl Marx, Cesare Lombroso, Jeremy Bentham, and Émile Durkheim. Criminology back in the late 19th century was a broader scope which included similar theories as sociology. A more current and encompassing definition of criminology is: The scientific study of crime, criminals, criminal behavior, and corrections. This is the definition that is more widely used than the one from the late 19th century. In general criminology has remained constant in terms of its science and how it is conducted. Research methods for criminology and well as early theories have had little if no change to those of today. The use of quantitative methods in criminology is still heavily used as it was when the discipline first developed, and the means of collection and analysis are still very similar.

Quantitative methods of research can be defined as "methods such as surveys and experiments that record variation in social life in terms of categories that vary in amount. Data that are treated as quantitative are either numbers or attributes that can be ordered in terms of magnitude" (Schutt 17).

This means that the research, unlike qualitative methods, is not based upon a subjective interpretation of the observations but aims to be a more objective and impartial analysis based on the numerical findings of quantitative research (Dantzker and Hunter 88).

In the study of criminology, the research methods tend to be quantitative because of the potential for bias in qualitative research. However, there are many issues not suitable for quantitative study. Debates and personal beliefs tend to be more influenced by emotion rather than scientific study. This makes quantitative research a difficult, but worthwhile method of research (Dantzker and Hunter 88).

Data sources in criminological research

There are multiple types of data that social scientists use to measure crime today. In order to measure crime, we must first come up with a definition of crime. There are many different definitions of crime out there, but a simple definition that I will use comes from Wilson and Herrnstein, in which they say crime is "any act committed in violation of a law that prohibits it and authorizes punishment for its commission" (Maxfield 111). Once we understand what crime is in itself, we can start to measure it.

There are generally four approaches to measure crime in order to get quantitative data: observing, victimization reports, surveys of offenders, and using data that has already been obtained.

Observation is far from the best way to measure crime. If one were to go by the ways police are informed of crime, either by observing it themselves, or by crimes reported to them, one would realize that some crimes will not be well measured. For example, shoplifting. There are tons of instances where shoplifting will neither be observed by police nor reported by other people. Therefore, crimes like shoplifting, drug possession and sales, etc. will not be accurately measured.

Another way of measuring crime is the FBI's Uniform Crime Reports, which are based on police measures of crime. But because the data in these reports are based on reported crimes, they share the same measurement problems that have been listed above. There are a number of errors in the UCR. First, the UCR does not try to count all reported crimes. Index offenses, also called Part I crimes, are only counted if they are reported AND recorded by police. Usually, there are always reports of crime, but police may choose not to record them for a number of reasons. Also, the UCR will not include Part II crimes only if the arrestee has been formally charged with a crime, because individual states may have varying definitions of these crimes (Maxfield 113). Another source of error is created by the hierarchy rule used by police agencies, which basically means that if a number of crimes are committed in one incident, to only count the most serious one in the UCR. 
However, do not think that the UCR is not helpful. UCR data represents groups of analysis, meaning that crime reports are available for cities and states; the data just does not represent individual crimes very well.

Asking people if they have been victims of crimes is a good way to measure data. This type is usually done in the form of a survey. Surveys can possibly have several advantages, like: obtaining information that has not been reported to authorities; finding out about crimes reported to police, but not recorded officially; and can provide data on victims and offenders and the incident themselves (Maxfield 115). An example of this is the National Crime Victimization Survey, or NCVS for short. The NCVS yields more data on individual victims, offenders, and incidents, meaning its better used for studies on individual factors in crime victimization. This is because it is a survey designed to represent nationwide levels of crime, but cannot provide crime estimates for cities or states (Maxfield 116).

Surveys of offenders are used just like victimization surveys, but these are for the offenders. The surveys often measure how many crimes the offender has committed. This type is helpful especially for victimless crimes, like prostitution, public order and delinquency crimes, and rarely reported crimes, like shoplifting. As with all surveys, there are some problems one may run into, such as dishonesty in responses and exaggeration, but these surveys help us to find out some data that would otherwise never be noted.

Because crime is really hard to measure, it is often best to combine many of these methods in order to get the most valid data for measurement.

Descriptive analysis and comparison
The quality of data must be evaluated. In this analysis process, it helps to have access to the raw data and the published data. This comparison can be more telling than simply the published data because there can be no bias in the comparison. Another valuable tool in research is the ability to compare newly collected data (primary data) with previously collected data (secondary data). There are two ways in which it can help: first, primary data can confirm newly found data, and second, differences in the data can point out problematic areas.

Data exchange can occur between nations. Data of this type is typified through census data or governmentally collected data. Exchange can also occur between regions, states and municipalities to improve social matters, fix problems, or just display differences.

Temporal data analysis is vital to our understanding of the world we live in and where we are headed. Data collected over time can show researchers infinite amounts of data that can aid in an equally large number of studies.

Measurement challenges in criminology
As with all forms of measurement, there are challenges associated with measuring data in criminology. There are a number of variables that influence police to record a crime or make an arrest. For example, an assault between people who know each other will less likely be recorded than a fight between two strangers. Also, there will be times when the victim will urge the police not to press charges on the offender or even arrest him/her. Roffee and Waling (2016) conducted a study investigating hate speech and hate crimes towards the LGBTQ community. They had established that all participants had been subjected to microaggressions and bullying, some of which would have been considered criminal. However, multiple people did not want to report these incidences, and some had not actually considered themselves to be victims of crimes. Evidently, the researches faced challenges in maintaining consistent data and avoiding re-traumatising the participants by heightening the seriousness of the incidents.

Arrest practices vary according to the counties that the crimes are committed in. For example, in a large city like Cleveland, Ohio, many minor crimes or infractions may go unreported just because the police have many more things to worry about besides small crimes, or may not even have the time to waste because of the heavy workload. But in a small city, more arrests may be made and reported because of the police not having too many things to do.

Another measurement challenge that often comes about is laws being changed. There are different laws everywhere, and laws often vary from state to state, and in some cases, county to county. 
One example of this is minor possession of marijuana laws. Several states have passed decriminalization laws, which call for allowing the possession or use of small amounts of marijuana, and would impose fines, rather than prison terms for transgressions of minor marijuana laws (DIANE 1181). The difference in laws hurts the measurement of crimes because crimes in one city or state may not be punishable in other states.

As with all forms of research studies, it is important to have a critical approach to statistics and measurements. There are problems associated with many forms of measurement, like the UCR and NCVS surveys, but looking at these statistics and measurements through a critical lens will help us to realize what statistics and measurements are valid and reliable.

Testing causation in criminological research
Criminology is interested in looking at crime and its relation to society. To do this criminologists often research causes of crime and factors for its occurrence. One way in which this is accomplished is through causation studies. Causation is a type of research method that examines and tries to interpret trends. Examining these methods helps criminologists look at ways to prevent crime and help determine underlying causes of crime. Causality is defined as a directional relationship between one event and another event, which is the result of the first. To look at causality in regards to criminology one can look at factors that affect why crime rates are higher in some areas as opposed to others. Studies have been conducted that show poverty, graduation rates, unemployment rates, police and corrections funding, and income inequality. Below are different theories that mechanisms that are believed to have a relation to crime, and specific case studies where these are applied.

How social relations affect criminality
Some theories that are often used in criminology to help get an understanding for why crimes are being committed are differential association and control theory. Edwin Sutherland developed the differential association theory. This theory's basis is that criminal behavior is a learned thing in which people learn to be criminals through other individuals. Through social interaction the people learn the values, attitudes, techniques, and motives for criminal behavior. Another popular theory is control theory, which was founded by William Glasser. This theory is described as saying behavior is caused by what a person wants most at any given time, and not by any outside stimuli. Control theory is based on the assumption that humans are not innately driven to crime, or they are drawn to conformity. However, control theory says that people are rational beings that will be drawn to crime when the advantages are greater than those of conformity. A studied that was conducted by Travis Hirschi from the Richmond Youth project analyzed self-reported delinquency and collected data from the Richmond Youth Center that contradicted the differential association theory, by collecting empirical evidence that supports his control theory. He concluded a boy who has intense relationships pertaining to the attachment of one or more other boys, who are delinquent, then the less likely that individual is going to be delinquent. He concluded this through observation and surveys. His argument is based on the notion that criminal behavior occurs only because of a learning process through someone else is not reliable. He feels that there are direct social mechanisms related to crime, as opposed to indirectly by one having an influence on that individual. An example of the differential association theory and how it applies to individuals can be illustrated through Albert Bandura's “Bobo” experiment. In this experiment a child views an adult beating up a blown-up doll. The child watches as the adult hits, kicks, throws, and abuses the doll. The adult leaves the room and the child enters the room. Only seconds after being alone the kids would model the behavior of the adults and abuse the doll with similar tactics. A control group was involved in the study where children were exposed to adults who were simply indifferent to the doll, and the kids modeled the behavior seen. The kids were not innately prone to violence, however when exposed to the treatment of the doll by other individuals the behavior was modeled almost exactly. This is a prime example of differential association in which it states criminal behavior is learned through interaction with others.

How neighborhood attributes affect crime rates
Another way to test causation in criminology is with the use of longitudinal data. Longitudinal data has the goals of quantifying trends in behavior, describe progression of life events, examine patterns of behavioral change, and begin to apply theories to such data. This type of data allows for the examination of causal research. It helps to evaluate programs such as intervention or rehab and also in regards to methods in reducing crime. Longitudinal research designs are ones that involve repeated measurement over time of one or more groups of subjects. This helps because it is research over time and is useful in determining causal relationships between variables. There are four specific types of designs that can be used, which include trend studies, cohort studies, panel designs, and time-series designs.

A theory that is used to explain disorganization in the neighborhoods is the social disorganization theory which was developed based on the works of Henry McKay and Clifford R. Shaw. This theory states that neighborhoods affected with high poverty rates and economic depression are often victim to high rates of population turnover. They are also commonly very diverse in their population. Social disorganization theory says that a high turnover rate in population lead to a failure in the development of an informal social structure, which results in difficulty in maintaining social order in a community. This in turn leads to high rates of violence and crime in that specific neighborhood.

Criminology as well as all social science often relies on sampling as a research method, for a variety of reasons. First is that if a sample is truly non-biased then it can be viewed as reliable data. Some issues that often come up with this are obtaining a biased sample, and not obtaining enough responses to get a truly representative sample of the population who are studying or trying to make generalizations about. Sampling is much more cost effective than observing, or trying to survey an entire population. Overall sampling can be a very reliable data source if conducted correctly.

New Directions
Neighborhoods have been a target of criminologists for current and recent research topics, and a great way of obtaining data from them has been hierarchical linear modeling: the key being spatial dependency. Spatial dependency deals with the association independently measured values have with each other. Another area of advancement in the field of criminology is developmental/life course theories. This entails quantitative methods that can handle longitudinal data. Longitudinal data is the collection of data from several units over a specific time range, is very useful to criminologists. Not only does this research data provide criminologists with valuable information about current situations, but it will provide useful data to future researchers attempting to observe change over time.

In both of these cases, the idea is that criminologists will be able to view data collected from groups of people (neighborhoods) and make appropriate conclusions based on the data. This data combined with data collected from smaller and larger groups and from other areas will hopefully provide criminologists with a valuable well of information about our society.

One important factor in all research is that methods will continue to change, improving the strength, diversity, scope, and effectiveness of data collected through research. Criminologists, like all other researchers will use advancements in other fields of research to help improve their own. Methods in Statistics, Economics, and other fields may prove useful to criminologists.

See also 

 Bayes' theorem
 Computational criminology
 Forensic statistics
 Journal of Quantitative Criminology
 Jurimetrics
 Predictive policing
 Social network analysis (criminology)
Qualitative research in criminology

Notes

References
Burgess, Robert and Akers, Ronald. "A Differential Association-Reinforcement Theory of Criminal Behavior." Social Problems, Vol. 14, No. 2. (Autumn, 1966), pp. 128–147.
Dantzker, ML, and Ronald D. Hunter. Research Methods For Criminology and Criminal Justice: A Primer. Butterworth-Heinemann, 2000.
Fox, James A., ed. Methods In Quantitative Criminology. New York: Academic Press, 1981.
Jones, Stephen. Criminology. New York: Oxford University Press, USA, 2006.
Kempf, Kimberly; Measurement Issues in Criminology. New York: Springer, 1990.
Matsueda, Ross. "Testing Control Theory and Differential Association: A Causal Modeling Approach". American Sociological Review, Vol. 47, No. 4. (Aug., 1982), pp. 489–504.
Maxfield, Michael G. Research Methods for Criminal Justice and Criminology. Ed. Earl Babbie. California: Wadsworth Publishing Company, 1995.
Neuman, Lawrence W., and Bruce Wiegand. Criminal Justice Research Methods. Allyn and Bacon, 2000.
Rihoux. “Qualitative Comparative Analysis (QCA) and Related Systematic Comparative Methods: Recent Advances and Remaining Challenges for Social Science Research.” International Sociology, v. 21 issue 5, 2006, p. 679-706.
Sampson; Robert J. & Groves, W. Byron; The American Journal of Sociology, Vol. 94, No. 4. (Jan., 1989), pp. 774–802.
Schutt, R.K. (2006). Investigating the Social World: The Process and Practice of Research
Siegel, Larry. Criminology. St. Paul: West Publishing Company, 1995.
Technologies for Understanding and Preventing Substance Abuse and Addiction by DIANE Publishing Company (Editor), DIANE Publishing Company (Editor), DIANE Publishing Company, April 1996, 250pp
Walker, Jeffrey T. Statistics In Criminal Justice: Analysis and Interpretation. Maryland: Aspen Publishers, Inc., 1999.
Walklate, Sandra. Criminology The Basics. New York: Routledge, 2005.

External links
https://web.archive.org/web/20080223163046/http://www.ojp.usdoj.gov/bjs/cvict.htm
Current research and New Directions

Criminology
Émile Durkheim